David Mullich is an American game producer and designer best known for creating the cult classic 1980 adventure game The Prisoner, producing the 1995 adaptation I Have No Mouth, and I Must Scream, and developing many games in the Heroes of Might and Magic franchise. With a career spanning more than twenty-five years, Mullich worked not only for some of the first video game publishers, but went on to work for some of the biggest game companies of today.

Career 
Mullich's work in video games began at the birth of the video game industry in 1978 when his COBOL professor at California State University, Northridge hired him to work as a clerk and programmer at Rainbow Computing, one of the first computer stores to open in the Los Angeles area. Sherwin Steffin, who was a frequent customer at the store, recruited Mullich to develop games for his new start-up game publishing company, Edu-Ware Services. Upon graduating in 1980 with a degree in computer science, Mullich joined Edu-Ware as a full-time employee, and as his first assignment created the ground-breaking adventure game The Prisoner.

Mullich went on to design most of Edu-Ware's innovative line of adventure games and role-playing video games, and programmed the company's EWS3 graphics engine as well as many of its educational programs. As the company grew, he was promoted to Vice President of Software Development and managed other programmers coding both entertainment and educational products designed by him and other members of the design staff. After five years, Mullich and several other key Edu-Ware employees left to form their own company, Electric Transit, which specialized in first-person 3D games and became Electronic Arts' first affiliated label publisher.

In 1987, Mullich joined Walt Disney Computer Software, where he produced video games based upon Disney characters, films, and television shows with external developers and licensees. Four years later he joined developer Interactive Support Group to create driving and action games for fifth-generation console systems CD-I and 3DO. Mullich next went on to become development director at game publisher Cyberdreams, where he produced award-winning games in collaboration with notables such as science fiction author Harlan Ellison, fantasy artist H.R. Giger and horror director Wes Craven.

While participating in a game design panel at the Computer Game Developer's Conference, Mullich met Jon Van Caneghem, founder of veteran game developer New World Computing. Van Caneghem hired Mullich in 1997 to lead the thirty-person development team for Heroes of Might and Magic. Mullich ran the team behind the best-selling strategy game franchise for five years, including the development of Heroes of Might and Magic III, named by video gamer magazine in 2005 as the 25th best game of all time.

With the financial demise of parent company The 3DO Company, Mullich left New World for software publishing giant Activision to produce Star Trek themed real-time strategy games and the Vampire: The Masquerade – Bloodlines role-playing game based upon the Half-Life 2 engine.

When his contract with Activision concluded, Mullich was hired by fellow Cyberdreams alumni Jamie Ottilie to be the development director of his mobile game publishing start-up, Abandon Mobile.

During the filming of Peter Jackson's The Lord of the Rings film trilogy, Mullich was a well-known member of the J.R.R. Tolkien on-line fan community, being a news reporter and film messageboard moderator for the website Tolkien Online and, under the pseudonym Ancalagon The Black, publisher of "The Complete List of Film Changes", documenting the differences between the films and the books.

The hero Sir Mullich in Heroes of Might and Magic III: Armageddon's Blade is named after him.

Personal life 

Married with children, Mullich lives in Valencia, California.

Games 
Titles developed or produced by Mullich span three decades. Most of his games are listed below in chronological order (non-entertainment titles excluded).

Published by Edu-Ware Services 
Space I (1979)
Space II (1979)
Windfall: The Oil Crisis Game (1980)
Network (1980)
The Prisoner (1980)
Empire I: World Builders (1981)
Rendezvous: A Space Shuttle Flight Simulation (1982)
Prisoner 2 (1982)
Empire II: Interstellar Sharks (1982)
Tranquility Base (1984)
Empire III: Armageddon (1984)

Published by Electric Transit 
Wilderness: A Survival Adventure (1986)
Lunar Explorer: A Space Flight Simulator (1986)

Published by Walt Disney Computer Software 
Win, Lose or Draw (1988)
Matterhorn Screamer (1988)
The Chase on Tom Sawyer's Island (1988)
DuckTales: The Quest for Gold (1990)
Mickey's Crossword Puzzle Maker (1991)

Published by Philips Interactive Media of America 
Video Speedway (1993)

Published by Cyberdreams 
I Have No Mouth, and I Must Scream (1995)
Dark Seed II (1995)
Noir: A Shadowy Thriller (1996)

Published by The 3DO Company 
Heroes of Might and Magic III (1999)
Heroes of Might and Magic III: Armageddon's Blade (1999)
Heroes of Might and Magic III: The Shadow of Death (2000)
Heroes Chronicles: Conquest of the Underworld (2000)
Heroes Chronicles: Masters of the Elements (2000)
Heroes Chronicles: Warlords of the Wastelands (2000)
Heroes Chronicles: The Final Chapters (2001)
Heroes of Might and Magic IV (2002)

Published by Activision 
Vampire: The Masquerade – Bloodlines (2004)

Published by Abandon Mobile 
Bode Miller Alpine Racing (2006)
NBC Sports Figure Skating (2006)
NBC Sports Heads-Up Poker (2006)
NBC Sports Real Golf (2006)
National Heads-Up Poker Championship (2007)
Marine Scout Sniper (2007)
Freaky Creatures (2009)

Published by Spin Master Studios 
Bakugan Dimensions (2010)
Zoobles (2010)

References

External links 

Geek of the Week: David Mullich at Gamasutra
Fellowship of the Ring at Wired Magazine (includes interview with Mullich and "Ancalagon The Black")
David Mullich: The Interview at Tea Leaves

California State University, Northridge alumni
American video game designers
American video game directors
American video game producers
American video game programmers
Edu-Ware
Living people
People from Valencia, Santa Clarita, California
Year of birth missing (living people)